The 1959–60 FAW Welsh Cup is the 73rd season of the annual knockout tournament for competitive football teams in Wales.

Key
League name pointed after clubs name.
CCL - Cheshire County League
FL D2 - Football League Second Division
FL D3 - Football League Third Division
FL D4 - Football League Fourth Division
SFL - Southern Football League
WLN - Welsh League North
WLS D1 - Welsh League South Division One

Fifth round
Ten winners from the Fourth round and six new clubs.

Sixth round

Semifinal
Cardiff City and Bangor City played at Wrexham, replay - at Newport, Wrexham and Abergavenny Thursdays played at Hereford.

Final

External links
The FAW Welsh Cup

1959-60
Wales
Cup